Spastic ataxia-corneal dystrophy syndrome (also known as Bedouin spastic ataxia syndrome) is an autosomally resessive disease. It has been found in an inbred Bedouin family. It was first described in 1986. A member of the family who was first diagnosed with this disease also had Bartter syndrome. It was concluded by its first descriptors Mousa-Al et al. that the disease is different from a disease known as corneal-cerebellar syndrome that had been found in 1985.

Symptoms include spastic ataxia, cataracts, macular corneal dystrophy and nonaxial myopia. Mental development is normal.

See also
 Rare disease

References

Further reading

External links 

Autosomal recessive disorders
Rare diseases
Syndromes